Ariel Vanguardia (born September 29, 1972) is a Filipino professional basketball coach. He is the interim head coach for the Blackwater Bossing of the Philippine Basketball Association (PBA).

Coaching career

Vanguardia previously coached the Westports Malaysia Dragons in the Asean Basketball League, where he won the team's first championship in 2016. On May 31, 2016, it was announced that he was appointed to his first PBA head coaching job as coach of the PBA team Phoenix Fuel Masters, replacing Koy Banal.
 
He also took over as team consultant of Blu Star Detergent Dragons, a team composed of the players of the Dragons in the 2016 PBA D-League Foundation Cup.

Coaching record

Collegiate record

Professional

References

1972 births
Living people
ASEAN Basketball League coaches
Filipino men's basketball coaches
TNT Tropang Giga coaches
Filipino expatriate basketball people in Malaysia
Filipino men's basketball players
Benilde Blazers basketball coaches
JRU Heavy Bombers basketball coaches
Barako Bull Energy Boosters coaches
Phoenix Super LPG Fuel Masters coaches
Blackwater Bossing coaches